Angelika may refer to:

 Angelika (given name)
 Angelika Film Center, theater chain

See also 
 Pieris angelika, butterfly 
 Angelica (disambiguation)
 Angelique (disambiguation)e